Denis Alexandrovich Afinogenov (born 15 March 1974) is a Russian retired professional ice hockey player, currently serving as head coach of Agidel Ufa of the Zhenskaya Hockey League (ZhHL), a position he has held since January 2016, and an assistant coach to the Russian women's national ice hockey team. 

During his playing career, Afinogenov played with several teams in the Russian Superleague, the Muskegon Fury of the United Hockey League (UHL), and HC Slovan Bratislava in the Slovak Extraliga.

References

External links

Living people
1974 births
HC Slovan Bratislava players
Sportspeople from Ufa
Russian ice hockey right wingers
Muskegon Fury players
Salavat Yulaev Ufa players
Lokomotiv Yaroslavl players
HC Lada Togliatti players
Avangard Omsk players
Metallurg Novokuznetsk players
Russian expatriate ice hockey people
Russian expatriate sportspeople in the Czech Republic
Russian expatriate sportspeople in the United States
Russian expatriate sportspeople in Slovakia
Russian expatriate sportspeople in Kazakhstan
Expatriate ice hockey players in Kazakhstan
Expatriate ice hockey players in the United States
Expatriate ice hockey players in the Czech Republic
Expatriate ice hockey players in Slovakia